Gateshead East and Washington West was a parliamentary constituency represented in the House of Commons of the Parliament of the United Kingdom from 1997 to 2010. It elected one Member of Parliament (MP) by the first past the post electoral system.

History
The constituency was created for the 1997 general election, primarily from the abolished Gateshead East seat, with the addition of two Washington wards from Houghton and Washington. 

It was abolished for the 2010 general election when the Boundary Commission reduced the number of seats in Tyne and Wear from 13 to 12, with the constituencies in the City of Sunderland, in particular, being reorganised. The majority of the seat was included in the re-established constituency of Gateshead, while the two Washington wards were included in the new seat of Washington and Sunderland West and the Pelaw and Heworth ward was transferred to Jarrow.

Boundaries
1997-2010

 The Metropolitan Borough of Gateshead wards of Chowdene, Felling, High Fell, Leam, Low Fell, and Pelaw and Heworth; and
 the City of Sunderland wards of Washington South and Washington West.

Members of Parliament

Election results

Elections of the 2000s

Elections of the 1990s

See also
History of parliamentary constituencies and boundaries in Tyne and Wear

Notes and references 

Parliamentary constituencies in Tyne and Wear (historic)
Constituencies of the Parliament of the United Kingdom established in 1997
Constituencies of the Parliament of the United Kingdom disestablished in 2010
Politics of Gateshead